is manga series written by Ikki Kajiwara with drawings by Mitsuyoshi Sonoda. An anime adaption directed by Ken Yamada and produced by Kimio Ikeda, Hiroshi Mishima and Takahashi Noboyuki for Tokyo TV Doga aired between 1970 and 1971, which consists of 52 episodes lasting about 24 minutes. The series aired in Japan on Nippon Television from 13 April 1970 to 5 April 1971, every Monday. In Italy it was broadcast for the first time in  1982, through local TV stations. Other transmissions aired on Super 3, Naples Channel 21 and TMC, with a different assembly of the opening theme and the end, and was better known by the title "ARRIVANO I SUPERBOYS".
It is the first anime dedicated to soccer.
It gained popularity among male soccer players at the time. In addition, it has been pointed out that the emphasis on spirit theory, technology commentary and had been neglected.

Plot
In the new neighborhoods that sprung up in the countryside on the outskirts of Tokyo is Shinsei High School. Among the students is the young and restless Shingo Tamai, a first year student. At the beginning of the school year he presents the new coach of the soccer team, Tenpei Matsuki, whom was also a former goalkeeper of the Japanese national football and bronze medal winner at the Olympic Games in Mexico. Matsuki intends to build a team that can compete at the highest levels. His intense workouts originally seems too much for many members of the team, including Shingo. He decides to boycott the team's "official" Matsuki team and creates his own. After a first victory, he is always defeated by that of Matsuki, which begins to be seen by Shingo as an invincible enemy. Subsequently, the two will be able to clarify their conflicting relationship and Shingo will eventually become the captain of the only school team coached by Matsuki.

Main characters

Shinsei High School
Shingo Tamai (Voiced by: Ryōichi Tanaka)
Position: Forward
The protagonist of this story, he is a freshman (1st year in Japan) high school soccer player. He is from downtown Tokyo and possess strong physical ability, but plays in selfish manner which hinders his ability to work as a team.
Tenpei Matsuki (Voiced by: Ichirō Murakoshi)
A former Japan representative and Mexico Olympic Bronze Medalist, Matsuki is the high school soccer coach who formerly was a goalkeeper. He retired from soccer after having received an injury after a fight with yakuza. He is rather sadist and pushes his team to the limit so they can win.
Yosuke Ohira (Voiced by: Shingo Kanemoto)
Position: Goalkeeper
A third year, Ohira is a large build man, who identifies himself the "boss" of school. He loses a fight with Tamai and thus gains his respect.
Hikaru Aota (Voiced by: Katsuji Mori)
Son of the PTA president and is generally wealthy. He participates in reckless behaviors until Tamai helps him turn around.
Jiro Komano (Voiced by: Kaneta Kimotsuki)
Shinsei High School football staff. He is very analytical and wears glasses.
Ryoko Asuka (Voiced by: Akiko Mori (Episodes 1–12. 25–28, 52), Hiroko Suzuki (Episodes 13–16))
A second year, she is very stout and prideful. She is the manager of the team.
Moriyama (Voiced by: Masahiko Murase)
Shinsei high school principal.

Rival teams
Jun Misugi (Voiced by: Osamu Ichikawa)
Position: Offensive Midfielder
Captain of Asakaze high school soccer. Tamai regards him as a genius.
 Kojuro Yamagata (Voiced by: Takeshi Kuwahara)
Position: Forward
Captain of the Kyoio high school soccer. He is a rival of Tamai.
Shunji Hayase (Voiced by: Shuichi Ikeda)
Asakaze high school soccer player.
Takeshi Kamioka (Voiced by: Rokurō Naya)
The Fujie West high school soccer coach and the brother of Tsuyoshi. He is a former Japan national soccer team player.
Tsuyoshi Kamioka (Voiced by: Keiichi Noda)
Position: Goalkeeper
Younger brother Takeshi Kamioka, Fujie West high school's soccer coach.
Bob Stanley
Position: Forward 
Soccer player of the American School.

Family
Mamoru Aota (Voiced by: Masashi Amenomori)
Shinsei High School PTA president and father of Hikaru.
Rinkichi Tamai (Voiced by: Tamio Ōki)
The adoptive father Shingo and a sushi chef.
Kimie Tamai (Voiced by: Reiko Kouke)
Adoptive Mother of Shingo Tamai.
Shin Nagata (Voiced by: Ichirō Nagai)
The real father  of "Makoto Nagata", who is actually Shingo Tamai.

Anime television original characters
Okawa (Voiced by: Shuusei Nakamura)
Machida (Voiced by: Rokurō Naya)
Hayato Taki (Voiced by: Ikuo Nishikawa (episodes 32–37), Takeo Tomoharu (episodes 38–52))
Saizo Yashima (Voiced by: Akio Nojima)
Sasuke Yashima (Voiced by: Akira Kamiya)
Sugihara (Voiced by: Takeshi Aono)
Narrator: Gorō Naya (Episode 1 - Episode 18)

Episodes

External links
original Japanese anime introduction

References

1971 Japanese television series endings
Association football in anime and manga
Nippon TV original programming
Action anime and manga
Television shows based on Japanese novels
Shōnen Gahōsha manga
Shōnen manga